Kamila Hawthorne  is a Welsh medical academic and a general practitioner. She has been a clinical professor of Medical Education, and Associate Dean for Medicine.

Early life and education
She qualified in medicine from University of Oxford in 1984, then completed her GP training in Nottingham in 1988.

Career
Hawthorne's clinical work in Butetown served a deprived area of Cardiff's docks.

She has taught medical students since 1991 and an examiner for the Membership of the Royal College of General Practitioners (MRCGP) since 1997.

Hawthorne was Vice Chair (Professional Development) at the Royal College of General Practitioners 2015–2018.

She was a Professor of Medical Education at Cardiff University School of Medicine, later becoming the Head of the Graduate Entry Medicine Programme at Swansea University.

She became a Fellow of the Royal College of General Practitioners in 2001, and Fellow of the Academy of Medical Educators in 2013.

She is a trustee of the RCGP and a trustee of the King's Fund. She was co-opted as a trustee to the Faculty of Medical Leadership and Management.

Honours
Hawthorne was made a Member of the Order of the British Empire (MBE) in the 2017 New Year Honours for services to general practice.

References

External links
 Profile at 100welshwomen.wales
 profile at the University of Surrey
 profile at Swansea University

Living people
Alumni of the University of Oxford
20th-century Welsh medical doctors
21st-century Welsh medical doctors
British general practitioners
Welsh women medical doctors
Fellows of the Royal College of General Practitioners
Fellows of the Royal College of Physicians
Fellows of the Academy of Medical Educators
Fellows of the Higher Education Academy
Academics of Cardiff University
Academics of the University of Surrey
Academics of Swansea University
20th-century women physicians
21st-century women physicians
Members of the Order of the British Empire
Year of birth missing (living people)
Welsh women academics